Subarnameru Temple is situated in Sonepur town in Subarnapur district of Odisha, India. It is a shrine for the worshipping of Shiva and commonly known as Second Varanasi of India.

Legend
Popular story of Gold coin Rain is associated with this Place, with this Temple when an ardent devotee asked lord for help, so the name is Sonepur or Subarnapur. The Place  attracts thousands of visitors and Pilgrimages for its scenic beauty as this temple is situated just on the Bank of Tel River.Major festivals are Shivaratri and Kartik Purnima.

Transport
Sonepur is well connected to nearest railhead Balangir. By road regular bus services are there from Bhubaneswar.Cuttack, Berhampur, Sambalpur.

References
the gold showering lord

Hindu temples in Sonepur